Petr Šindelář (born 16 November 1975 in Zlín) is a Czech snowboarder. He placed 28th in the men's parallel giant slalom event at the 2010 Winter Olympics.

References

1975 births
Living people
Czech male snowboarders
Olympic snowboarders of the Czech Republic
Snowboarders at the 2010 Winter Olympics
Sportspeople from Zlín